The Harbin-Wuchang Through Train is an express rail passenger service running between Harbin and Wuchang. These trains are Type 25B passenger trains operated by the Harbin Railway Bureau. They cover the 108 km distance on the Labin Railway, crossing Heilongjiang province.

Train services 
6231: Wuchang - Harbin East
6232: Xiangfang - Wuchang
6233: Wuchang - Harbin East
6234: Harbin East - Wuchang
K7211: Wuchang - Xiangfang
K7212: Xiangfang - Wuchang
K7213: Wuchang - Xiangfang
K7214: Xiangfang - Wuchang
K7215: Wuchang - Xiangfang
K7216: Xiangfang - Wuchang
K7217: Wuchang - Xiangfang
K7218: Xiangfang - Wuchang

References

External links 
哈铁开行城际间“公交化”列车 到五常看龙江千尺第一瀑

K
Rail transport in Heilongjiang